A time temperature indicator (TTI) is a device or smart label that shows the accumulated time-temperature history of a product.  Time temperature indicators are commonly used on food, pharmaceutical, and medical products to indicate exposure to excessive temperature (and time at temperature).

In contrast, a Temperature data logger measures and records the temperatures for a specified time period.  The digital data can be downloaded and analyzed.

Technology
There are a large number of different time temperature indicators available in the market, based on different technologies.  Some devices are based migration of dye through a filter paper, while others contain pouches with bacterial fluids that change color when certain time-temperature combinations have been reached.  To the degree that these physical changes in the indicator match the degradation rate of the food, the indicator can help indicate probable food degradation.

Digital Temperature data loggers are available to indicate the full temperature history of a shipment to help identify the time period that out-of-tolerance temperatures were encountered.  This temperature history can be used to calculate the loss of shelf life or the likelihood of spoilage.  These small recorders are also used to identify the time (and thus location) of a shipment when the problem occurred, which allows for corrective action.

Types 
The basic types of time-temperature indicators (TTIs) include

 Partial history indicators– These are time-temperature indicators that provide a visual indication of whether a product has been exposed to temperatures outside of the recommended range during a specific portion of its life cycle. 
 Full history indicators– Unlike partial history indicators, full history gives an indication on whether the product has been exposed to the recommended range during the entire life cycle.
 Critical temperature indicators– These types of TTIs monitor a critical temperature threshold that, if exceeded, may cause irreversible damage to the product.

Other types include:

 Time-temperature labels
 Radio frequency identification (RFID) TTIs
 Enzyme-based TTIs
 Microbial-based TTIs

TTI's food industry
Time-temperature indicators can be used on food products that are dependent on a controlled temperature environment.  Certain technologies can also be used for frozen food and the cold chain.

Benefits
Surveys within the EU projects "Freshlabel" and "Chill-on" have shown a positive feedback by consumers to the use of TTIs on food products.  As TTIs help assure the cool chain of food products, they are expected to reduce the amount of food waste, as well as reducing the number of foodborne illnesses.

Regulation
The World Health Organization regulates the use of TTIs for certain medical products.  There is extensive regulation by the FDA on the use of TTIs on US seafood products.

See also
Humidity indicator card

References

General References

 ASTM F1416 Standard Guide for Selection of Time-Temperature Indicators
 Yam, K. L., "Encyclopedia of Packaging Technology", John Wiley & Sons, 2009, 
Taoukis, P. and T.P. Labuza. 2003. Time temperature indicators. In: Novel Food Packaging Techniques. R. Ahvenainen (ed.). Woodhead Publ., Cambridge, UK.

External links
  FDA regulation on the use of TTI's in the seafood industry.
 Article on the introduction of a TTI at a large food producer 
 WRAP Food Waste Report (PDF-Datei; 1,44 MB)
 WHO Factsheet on the global amount of food related illnesses
 Article on the introduction of a TTI at a food producer in Switzerland

Food safety
Drug safety
Temperature control
Packaging